Sakhidad Hamidi (born 10 October 1952) is an Afghan former wrestler who competed in the 1980 Summer Olympics.

References

1952 births
Living people
Olympic wrestlers of Afghanistan
Wrestlers at the 1980 Summer Olympics
Afghan male sport wrestlers